Noccundra is a rural town and locality in the Shire of Bulloo in South West Queensland, Australia. The town was previously known as Nocundra. Prior to 2020 the locality was previously known as Nockatunga.

Geography 
The town is on the banks of the Wilson River 145 kilometres from and 160 kilometres west of Thargomindah and contained within the pastoral holding of Nockatunga Station.

History 
Andrew Hume's ill-fated expedition, to rescue long-term survivors of Leichhardt's 1848 expedition, perished of thirst to the west of Noccundra. 

The name Noccundra comes from the pastoral run, name in 1866, derived from the Aboriginal words nocka meaning water and tunga meaning smell.

The town was established in 1882 with the construction of the Noccundra Hotel which is also known as the Noccundra Pub. The hotel is constructed of sandstone mined from Mount Poole, New South Wales and brought to Noccundra by camel train.

Noccundra was spelt Nocundra originally, and its post office under that name opened on 11 October 1890 (a receiving office had been open from 1889) and closed in 1933.

On 17 April 2020 the Queensland Government reorganised the nine localities in the Shire, resulting in six localities. As part of these changes the locality of Nockatunga was renamed Noccundra after the only town in the locality.

Amenities 
The Noccundra Hotel in Wilson Street is Noccundra's only occupied building, housing a permanent population of three. The stone hotel building is heritage-listed, and is an important building for its long connection with the community of the surrounding area as a venue for many social events, including the Noccundra Rodeo and Bi-annual Ball. 

An airstrip is behind the hotel.

A memorial to Andrew Hume is on the western side of the hotel.

References

External links

Towns in Queensland
South West Queensland
Shire of Bulloo
Localities in Queensland